Olearia solandri, commonly known as coastal daisy-bush or coastal tree daisy, is a coastal shrub of New Zealand.

The plant has an upright, bushy stature, with leaves 5–8 mm long. O. solandri can grow into a small tree about four metres high.

References

External links

Flora of New Zealand
solandri